Melina León (born 12 July 1973 as Yamillette Aponte Yunqué in Río Piedras, Puerto Rico) is a Puerto Rican merengue singer and actress. From an early age she performed with several groups including The Rubi, Girls of Puerto Rico and The Cherries, with whom she appeared in several San Juan hotels.  Her first recording, Mujeres Liberadas, appeared in 1997 on the Tropix Music label.  This was followed in 1998 with a Sony release, Con Los Pies Sobre La Tierra.  By 2003, she was also performing as an actress on television movies such as: "Yo Creo en Santa Claus" in 2004, broadcast by Televicentro in Puerto Rico, and Wapa America in the United States, among others, and has received several popular awards and had several successful albums and singles on the Billboard Tropical and Latin charts.

Musical career
León started singing as a girl in musical festivals and music contests. At the age of 15, she joined a group called Las Cheris (The Cherries). After that she formed a group called Ruby which released an album through Independent Musical Productions.

Tropix Music signed her as a solo artist and she released her first album Mujeres Liberadas (Liberated Women) in 1997 which reached the top 10 of the Billboard tropical charts. The title track was a top 20 track on the Latin charts.

This attracted the interest of Sony Music who released her second album Con Los Pies Sobre La Tierra produced by Eduardo Reyes which made both the Billboard Latin and Billboard tropical album charts. Me Voy De Fiesta became another sizable hit single.

Baño de Luna was another top 10 Latin album when released and also won best female merengue singer by Premios de Musica 2000. Corazón de Mujer was another top 10 Latin album which was nominated for best tropical/salsa album in the 2002 Billboard Latin Awards. A self-titled album reached the top 15 of the Billboard tropical album charts in 2003 while she has also released an album called Serie Azul Tropical. In 2006, she recorded an album with the famous Colombian vocal group: Los Trío, and together taped a T.V. Special about it, broadcast by Tu Universo Television.

In 2010 Melina Leon won her first Premio Lo Nuestro Award as Best Tropical Female Artist.  She is also an advocate for mother and kids.

She is featured on the single "No soy tu tipo" on J'Martin's album Para Ti.

Boat accident
On Thursday, 2 April 2015, Melina Leon went to Culebra island for an Easter weekend vacation. While on their way to Culebrita island (an atoll off Culebra), a boat that she and her family and friends had boarded exploded, injuring a friend. Leon was uninjured in the accident.

Discography
This is a discography of León's charting albums on Billboard's Latin and tropical charts.

 Mujeres Liberadas (1997) #9 Tropical/Salsa
 singles Mujeres Liberadas, Ya No Soy Buena
 Con los Pies Sobre la Tierra (1998) #5 Tropical #26 Latin
 singles Me Voy Fiesta Hoy, Te Crucifico O Te Santifico, Vieje Al Cielo, La Persona Equivocada,
 Baño de Luna (2000) #3 Tropical #8 Latin
singles Baño de Luna, Cuando Una Mujer, Siento
 Corazon de Mujer (2001) #1 Tropical #7 Latin #40 Heatseeker
 Corazon de Mujer, Qué será de ti, Un Hombre de Verdad
 Melina León (2004) No. 14 Tropical
 Quiero Ser Tuya
 Vas A Pagar...y sus Exitos (2007)
 Vas A Pagar
 No Seas Cobarde (2008)
 No Seas Cobarde
 Todavia Duele
 Dos Caras (2010)
 Nos Vamos De Fiesta
 Caminando

References

External links

 [ Allmusic Melina León]
 VH1 Melina León article
 
 Myspace fan club
 Myspace

1972 births
Living people
People from Río Piedras, Puerto Rico
Merengue musicians
20th-century Puerto Rican women singers
21st-century Puerto Rican women singers
Women in Latin music